This article shows the record of Fulham Football Club against each of the Football League clubs they have played against in all four divisions since 1907. Although formed in 1879, Fulham were not elected to the Football League until 1907. They have played 106 clubs in the Football League since 1907 in all Divisions.  

Fulham's first competitive match was against Maidenhead United on 10 September 1898 in the Southern League but by 3 September 1907 they had been promoted to the Football League Division Two. Their first match was a home defeat by Hull City. Apart from a brief spell of four seasons in Division 3 (S) they stayed in League Division 2 until promoted to the (old) Division One for the first time in 1949. A memorable F.A.Cup run in 1975 saw them play West Ham United in the final at Wembley, losing 0–2. Tough times were ahead in the late 1980s and early 1990s when they slipped down to next to the bottom of the old Third Division at one time. But by 2001, with new chairman Mohammed El Fayed in control of the club, Fulham were promoted to the Top Division, now named The Premiership.

Then followed thirteen years of top flight football at Craven Cottage in the Premiership, once finishing in 7th place. In July 2013, Shahid Khan negotiated the purchase of Fulham FC from its previous owner, Mohamed Al Fayed. The deal was finalised on 12 July 2013, with the amount estimated between £150–200 million, but after one season they were relegated to the new Championship League in 2014. They were promoted back to the Premiership via the play-offs in May 2018, however Fulham had a tough time throughout that first season in the top division and after two managerial changes, were relegated again at the end of 2019. 
The popular ex-midfield player Scott Parker was appointed manager in May 2019 and although the 2019–2020 season was latterly interrupted as a result of the COVID-19 lockdown, during which time all teams played behind closed doors, it eventually restarted with Fulham finishing in fourth position in the Championship. The club gained promotion back to the Premiership again in the play-offs in August 2020 at Wembley. 
The continued Covid-19 pandemic prevented fans from attending all but the very last game of the season. But Premiership football for Fulham only lasted for that one season and the club was relegated at the end of the 2021 season - a repeat of 2019.
Then in July 2021 Marco da Silva was appointed as the new Fulham Manager taking over from Scott Parker who left to manage Bournemouth. Some excellent signings were made including the talented Fabio Carvalho and Harry Wilson. Fulham played superbly in the 2021-2022 season with Aleksandar Mitrovic scoring an incredible 43 goals in 44 appearances, breaking the record for the most goals scored in a 46-game English league season. With Tom Cairney back in form a good start continued throughout the season - inevitably with some slip ups! - with the club winning the Championship and having the best goal difference in all Leagues, Mitrovic being awarded the 'Golden Boot'. Premiership next season!

Key
 The table includes results of matches played by Fulham in the English Football League since 1907 to date. Wartime matches are regarded as unofficial and are excluded, as are matches from the abandoned 1939–40 season. F.A.Cup games, Championship Play-Off matches and Test Matches are also not included, and matches in the Southern Football League (1899 to 1907) are not included because exact records are hard to locate.
 For the sake of simplicity, present-day names are used throughout: for example, results against Ardwick, Small Heath and Woolwich Arsenal are integrated into the records against Manchester City, Birmingham City and Arsenal, respectively.
 Fulham have played a total of 4,372 games in the Football League since 1907.

 P = matches played; W = matches won; D = matches drawn; L = matches lost; F = goals for; A = goals against; Win% = percentage of total matches won.

List
All statistics are correct up to the close of season 2021-2022. The site will be updated again at the end of 2022-2023 season. Clubs currently in the Premiership are indicated in the far right column.''

indicates defunct football team.  

TOTAL FOOTBALL LEAGUE MATCHES PLAYED =  4372 (till end of 2021-2022 season).

References

External links
Head to Head record on Soccerbase
Head to Head record on Statto (search for the team)

League Record By Opponent
Fulham